Richard Renald Lorenc (born 3 December 1951) is an Australian former football (soccer) referee. He is, as of July 2009, referees coordinator for Football New South Wales.

Lorenc's career highlight was as an assistant referee at the 1990 FIFA World Cup in Italy. He also served as a FIFA referee at the 1987 and 1993 World Youth Championships, and officiated in 1994 World Cup qualifiers. He is known to have officiated international matches during the period from 1987 to 1995.

References

1951 births
Australian soccer referees
Living people
1990 FIFA World Cup referees
FIFA World Cup referees